The 10th World Championships in Athletics, under the auspices of the International Association of Athletics Federations (IAAF), were held in the Olympic Stadium, Helsinki, Finland (6 August 2005 – 14 August 2005), the site of the first IAAF World Championships in 1983. One theme of the 2005 championships was paralympic events, some of which were included as exhibition events.  Much of the event was played in extremely heavy rainfall.

Background

Bidding
The original winning bid for the competition was for London but the cost to build the required stadium at Picketts Lock and host the event was deemed too expensive by the government. UK Athletics suggested to move the host city to Sheffield (using Don Valley Stadium), but the IAAF stated that having London as the host city was central to their winning the bid. The championships bidding process was reopened as a result. The United Kingdom's withdrawal as host was the first case for a major sporting event in a developed country since Denver's withdrawal as host of the 1976 Winter Olympics.

Helsinki was considered by many to be the outsider in the race to host the games with rival bids being presented by Berlin in Germany; Brussels in Belgium, Budapest in Hungary, Moscow in Russia and Rome in Italy.

Opening ceremony
Apocalyptica and Nightwish performed at the opening ceremony of the event over a heavy rainfall. Geir Rönning, Finland's Eurovision Song Contest 2005 entrant, sang "Victory" the official song of the 2005 IAAF World Championships.

Events
With the addition of the women's 3000 metres steeplechase to the schedule, that year's program of events was closer to parity for women and men. With the exception of the 50 km walk the women competed in practically the same events as the men. Two differences remaining from before, though, were the short hurdles race (100 metres for women vs. 110 metres for men), and the multi-event competition (heptathlon for women vs. decathlon for men).

Since the first World Championships in Helsinki 1983, seven new events have been added for women:

 10000 metres, introduced in 1987
 5000 metres, replaced 3000 metres in 1995
 triple jump, introduced in 1993
 20 km walk introduced in 1999, replaced 10 km walk that first appeared in 1987
 pole vault, introduced in 1999
 hammer throw, introduced in 1999
 3000 metres steeplechase, introduced in 2005

Drug testing
The IAAF conducted their largest ever anti-doping program at an athletics event for the championships, with 705 athletes subjected to a total 884 of tests. There were two athletes who failed drugs tests: Indian discus thrower Neelam Jaswant Singh tested positive for the stimulant pemoline, and Vladyslav Piskunov, a Ukrainian hammer thrower, tested positive for the steroid drostanolone. Singh received a two-year ineligibility ban, while Piskunov received a life ban from athletics as this was his second offence.

In March 2013, the IAAF announced that re-testing of samples taken during these championships revealed that five medal winners had proved positive for banned substances. The athletes involved were Belarusian Nadzeya Ostapchuk (shot put gold),  Belarusian Ivan Tsikhan (hammer throw gold), Russian Olga Kuzenkova (hammer throw gold), Russian Tatyana Kotova (long jump silver) and Belarus's Vadim Devyatovskiy (men's hammer silver). Belarusian Andrei Mikhnevich (shot put 6th) had also tested positive and was disqualified.

Men's results

Track
2001 | 2003 | 2005 | 2007 | 2009

Note: * Indicates athletes who ran in preliminary rounds.

Field
2001 | 2003 | 2005 | 2007 | 2009

Women's results

Track
2001 | 2003 | 2005 | 2007 | 2009

Note: * Indicates athletes who ran in preliminary rounds.

Field
2001 | 2003 | 2005 | 2007 | 2009

Exhibition events
Paralympic exhibition events at the World Championships:

Medal table

Commemorative coin

To commemorate the 2005 World Championships in Athletics the Finnish government issued a high-value commemorative euro coin, the €20 10th IAAF World Championships in Athletics commemorative coin, minted in 2005. The obverse of the coin features Helsinki Olympic Stadium and above the stadium random waves express the feeling of the games.

See also
 2005 in athletics (track and field)

References

External links

Results from the IAAF web site

 
World Athletics Championships
International sports competitions in Helsinki
World Championships In Athletics, 2005
World Championships
International athletics competitions hosted by Finland
2000s in Helsinki
August 2005 sports events in Europe
Athletics in Helsinki